Poecilopharis are beetles from the subfamily Cetoniinae, tribe Schizorhinini. The genus was created by Ernst Gustav Kraatz in 1880. The type of the genus is the species Schizorhina bouruensis Wallace, 1867.
Metallic green in colour, often gaudy decorated with orange. Mesosternal process horizontal and flattened with raised tip. Protibia tridentate with long, tapering teeth grouped together at the tip. Clypeus tucked in, simply sinuate. Pronotum with the basal median lobe only covering the base of the scutellum.
The genus is spread throughout the whole Australian region.

List of the described species and subspecies 

 Poecilopharis allardi Rigout, 1997 
 Poecilopharis allardi tannaensis Rigout, 1997 
 Poecilopharis angulicollis Schürhoff, 1936 
 Poecilopharis angulicollis penicillata Schürhoff, 1936 
 Poecilopharis antonei Allard, 1995 
 Poecilopharis aruana (Wallace, 1867) 
 Poecilopharis bimaculata Schürhoff, 1936 
 Poecilopharis bouruensis (Wallace, 1867) 
 Poecilopharis bouruensis laevipennis Ritsema, 1881 
 Poecilopharis curtisi Waterhouse, 1884 
 Poecilopharis dechambrei Allard, 1995 
 Poecilopharis emilia (White, 1856) 
 Poecilopharis femorata Waterhouse, 1894 
 Poecilopharis flavens Heller, 1916 
 Poecilopharis fromentae Rigout, 1997 
 Poecilopharis gressitti Rigout, 1997 
 Poecilopharis kerleyi Allard, 1995 
 Poecilopharis lachaumei Allard, 1995 
 Poecilopharis laeviclypeata Schürhoff, 1936 
 Poecilopharis leai Schürhoff, 1936 
 Poecilopharis minuta Moser, 1901 
 Poecilopharis moana Moser, 1908 
 Poecilopharis morrisi Allard, 1995 
 Poecilopharis poggii Allard, 1995 
 Poecilopharis poggii flyensis Rigout, 1997 
 Poecilopharis porioni Allard, 1995 
 Poecilopharis quadrimaculata Schürhoff, 1936 
 Poecilopharis rufofemorata Heller, 1916 
 Poecilopharis ruteri Allard, 1995 
 Poecilopharis samuelsoni Rigout, 1997 
 Poecilopharis schochi Schürhoff, 1936 
 Poecilopharis schochi buloloensis Allard, 1995 
 Poecilopharis schochi lufaensis Allard, 1995 
 Poecilopharis speiseri Heller, 1916 
 Poecilopharis truncatipennis (Ritsema, 1881)
 Poecilopharis uniformis Waterhouse, 1884 
 Poecilopharis uniformis makiraensis Rigout, 1997 
 Poecilopharis valcklucasseni Schürhoff, 1936 
 Poecilopharis wallacei Schürhoff, 1936 
 Poecilopharis whitei (J. Thomson, 1860) 
 Poecilopharis woodfordi Waterhouse, 1887 
 Poecilopharis woodfordi bukaensis Rigout, 1997

Details of the species and subspecies 

 Poecilopharis allardi Rigout, 1997
The insect from the island of Erromango, New Hebrides. A large coppery species recalling emilia, but of a more stocky stature. Paramers resembling those of samuelsoni. The type specimen is in the Bernice P. Bishop Museum, Honolulu.
 Poecilopharis allardi tannaensis Rigout, 1997
The insect from the Tanna island, smaller and more bluish. The type specimen is in the Bernice P. Bishop Museum, Honolulu.
 Poecilopharis angulicollis Schürhoff, 1936
The insect is chocolate colour, West Papua.
 Poecilopharis angulicollis penicillata Schürhoff, 1936
Smaller with a very weak elytral punctation from the Madang region.
 Poecilopharis antoinei Allard, 1995
Shiny dark green, orange marks reduced. From Nissan island. The type specimen is in the Allard's collection.
 Poecilopharis aruana (Wallace), 1867
Described as Schizorhina aruana, close to leai, but slimmer, the punctation lines are more parallel. The type specimen is in the Paris Museum.
 Poecilopharis bimaculata Schürhoff, 1936
Insect from New Britain, very small, shiny, dark, with yellowish marks.
 Poecilopharis buruensis (Wallace), 1867
Described as Schizorhina buruensis, this insect from the eastern part of the Buru island is dark, shiny, olive green with a few residual yellow dots. The type specimen is in the Paris Museum.
 Poecilopharis buruensis laevipennis Ritsema, 181
From the western part of the Buru island, the insect is metallic golden green, the orange marks almost totally absent.
 Poecilopharis curtisi Waterhouse, 1884
From the Larat island, a species with no punctation and of metallic green colour with copper red brilliance.
 Poecilopharis dechambrei Allard, 1995
Shiny dark green, weak elytral punctation. From the New Hebrid (no more precise location). The type specimen is in the Paris Museum.
 Poecilopharis emilia (White), 1856
Described as Schizorhina emilia, an insect from the Anatom island, in the New Hebrides, small with a shiny greenish black colour, covered with regular orange patterns.
 Poecilopharis femorata Waterhouse, 1894
From the Arfak region, West Papua. Uniform dark green, legs copper red.
 Poecilopharis flavens Heller, 1916
From the Vaté island, New Hebrides. Orange ground colour with greenish brown marks.
 Poecilopharis fromentae Rigout, 1997
The insect from the island of Ghanongga, Solomon islands. Cohabiting with uniformis with the two external teeth of the tibia close together and some differences in the paramers. The type specimen is in the Paris Museum.
 Poecilopharis gressitti Rigout, 1997
The insect from the Nggela island, Solomon islands. Close to woodfordi but less elongated, the patterns less clear and some differences in the paramers. The type specimen is in the Bernice P. Bishop Museum, Honolulu.
 Poecilopharis gressitti ssp.
From the Choiseul island, has an unusual ending of the aedeagus.
 Poecilopharis kerleyi Allard, 1995
Shiny, sparkling green, weak elytral orange maculation. From Guadalcanal, in the Solomon islands. The type specimen is in the British Museum.
 Poecilopharis lachaumei Allard, 1995
A small, black species with very small orange marks, living in the Rossel island. The type specimen is in the Paris Museum.
 Poecilopharis laeviclypeata Schürhoff, 1936
Close to moana, the edges of the elytral suture even less marked. The type specimen come from "Namanumi, Fleet island" (?).
 Poecilopharis leai Schürhoff, 1936
The Australian insect from N. Queensland. It has double marginal band on the pronotum and a strong elytral punctation.
 Poecilopharis minuta Moser, 1901
A very small species from the Larat island with a strong elytral punctation.
 Poecilopharis moana Moser, 1908
From the Moa island, copper green with an orange maculation.
 Poecilopharis morrisi Allard, 1995
A species from E. Sepik, Papua New Guinea. Ground colour olive black  and a fine punctation. The type specimen is in the Paris Museum.

 Poecilopharis poggii Allard, 1995
A species from the Yapen island. Small, shiny dark brown species with weak punctation. The type specimen is in the Museo Civico di Storia Naturale "Giacomo Doria", Italy.
 Poecilopharis poggii flyensis Rigout, 1997
A subspecies from the Fly river, Western Prov., Papua New Guinea. Much more coloured in appearance, with a much wider spatula. The type specimen is in the Bernice P. Bishop Museum, Honolulu.
 Poecilopharis poggii  ssp.
The specimens from Madang have a similar spatula but the protibial teeth very tapering.
 Poecilopharis porioni Allard, 1995
Green colour with gold and reddish reflections, weak orange maculation. From Rotuma (North of the Fiji islands). The type specimen is in the British Museum.
 Poecilopharis quadrimaculata Schürhoff, 1936
The species from New Ireland with a bronze colour and yellowish marks.
 Poecilopharis rufofemorata Heller, 1916
From the New Hebrides: Spiritu Santo and Malekula islands. A large species with extended yellow marks on a dark mauve background.
 Poecilopharis ruteri Allard, 1995
A species from Halmaera which makes the transition to the Anacamptorrhina, the tip of the clypeus being strongly indented. The type specimen is in the Paris Museum.
 Poecilopharis samuelsoni Rigout, 1997
The insect from the Banks island, New Hebrides. Shiny blue green colour and general appearance different from the other currently known Poecilopharis. The type specimen is in the Bernice P. Bishop Museum, Honolulu and was dedicated to the great entomologist Dr. G. Allan Samuelson.
 Poecilopharis schochi Schürhoff, 1936
This is the species named aruana by Schoch in 1896. It comes from the Morobe Province, Papua New Guinea. The yellow patterns are of variable size.
 Poecilopharis schochi buloloensis Allard, 1995
From a place close to Bulolo, an insect usually small, with a very extensive orange maculation. The type specimen is in the Paris Museum.
 Poecilopharis schochi lufaensis Allard, 1995
A subspecies (or a true species) from Lufa, East Highlands Province, small size, chocolate colour with confluent yellow maculation. The type specimen is in the Paris Museum.
 Poecilopharis speiseri Heller, 1916
From the New Hebrides: Banks islands. A large species with a shiny light brown ground colour.
 Poecilopharis truncatipennis (Ritsema), 1881
Described as Schizorhina truncatipennis, an insect from the Key island, with orange maculation in a black ground colour.
 Poecilopharis uniformis Waterhouse, 1887
This is the insect from the south of the Solomon archipelago, almost a uniform dark green, the pronotum very little punctate.
 Poecilopharis uniformis makiraensis Rigout, 1897
The subspecies from the island of San Cristobal (now Makira), Solomon Islands. Uniform green colour with bright copper reflections. The type specimen is in the British Museum.
{{Gallery
|title=Specimens of Poecilopharis
|width=250
|height=450
|lines=4
|File:Poecilopharis ghizoensis Type.jpg| Poecilopharis uniformis ssp. female
|File:Poecilopharis uniformis ssp.jpg|Poecilopharis uniformis ssp. female
|File:Poecilopharis woodfordi Type.jpg|Poecilopharis woodfordi  Holotype male
| | Poecilopharis woodfordi bukaensis Holotype female
}}
 Poecilopharis uniformis ssp.
In the island of Ghizzo the specimens have a strong pronotal punctations. Same specimens exist also at the neighbouring island of Ganonggha. 
 Poecilopharis valcklucasseni Schürhoff, 1936
This is the species from the Batjan island. The general appearance is dark copper red.
 Poecilopharis whitei (J. Thomson), 1860
Described as Schizorhina whitei, an insect from the Aru and Key islands, with a shiny blue green colour.
 Poecilopharis woodfordi Waterhouse, 1887
The insect from the small island south of Bougainville is dark green with very few orange markings.
 Poecilopharis woodfordi bukaensis''' Rigout, 1997
The specimens from Bougainville are strongly marked with orange, those from the island of Buka even having bronze reflections.

The details of the paramers and of the first tibia have been published in the volume 25 of The Beetles of the World, together with a general distribution map.

 References 
  1. Allard (V.), 1995, The Beetles of the World, volume 23, Sciences Nat, Venette 
  2. Rigout (J.) et Allard (V.), 1997, The Beetles of the World, volume 25, Hillside Books, Canterbury 
  3. Schürhoff (P.N.), 1934, Beiträge zur Kenntnis der Cetoniden IV. Die Gattung Poecilopharis Kraatz, Mitt. dt. ent. Ges.'', 6, pp. 65–73

Cetoniinae